Knock Out  is a 2010 Indian Hindi-language action thriller film directed by Mani Shankar. The film stars Sanjay Dutt, Irrfan Khan and Kangana Ranaut, and is an unauthorized remake of Phone Booth. In October 2010, the Bombay High Court ordered the film's producers to pay a portion of their revenues to 20th Century Fox, who own the rights to Phone Booth. Released on 15 October 2010, the film was a commercial failure.

Plot
Bachubhai (Irrfan Khan) has come to a phone booth to make a call. He is interrupted by a man who interrupts him again. Bachubhai tells him to stop interrupting. While moving out of the phone booth after the call, the phone rings. Bachubhai picks up the call only to get surprised by an unknown caller who ensures that Bachubhai does not leave the phone booth until his motive of calling is achieved.  Another man interrupts who is shot dead by that unknown person from a far away building. As seeing the incident, police, public, and news reporter Nidhi Srivastav Kangana Ranaut arrive. Everyone is seeing everything as Bachubhai has been told to do what the person on the phone call says or he will shoot him. Later, Police officer Sushant Singh is transferred, and another encounter specialist has been called. Meanwhile, Bachubhai, who is working for a corrupt politician who has 320 billion black money, has been told to transfer the money on a government account to give back the money to the public. Bachubhai does everything as the phone caller says. At the end of the movie, the money has been transferred to the public account, and it is revealed that Veer Vijay Singh (Sanjay Dutt) is a Chief of Investigation Bureau. Bachubhai, after transferring the money, nothing happens to him.

Cast
Sanjay Dutt as Veer Vijay Singh, Chief of Ops, IB/Colonel Gill
Irrfan Khan as Bachchoo Bhai / Tony Khosla
Kangana Ranaut as Nidhi Srivastava, India TV reporter
Gulshan Grover as Bapuji
Rukhsar Rehman as Lakshmi Khosla, Tony's wife
Sushant Singh as Inspector Vikram
Asif Basra as Raghav
Bikramjeet Kanwarpal as editor, Nidhi's boss
Kurush Deboo as Sandwichwala
Abhay Shukla as Prithvi
Shankar Sachdeva as Mishra
Shriya Sharma as Sweety Khosla, Tony's daughter
Naseer Abdullah as Bhalla
Namrata Thapa as Roshni
Apoorva Lakhia as Ranvir Singh
Ashraful Haque as Junkie
Shreya Narayan as Jesse
Aparna as Bharti
Silvio Simac as fighter on terrace
Rajendra Jadhav as Gundurao
Vinay Verma as Commissioner
M D Pasha as Suvarna
Hussain Shaikh as Party President
Gary Warren D'souza as Swiss Bank Manager
Randheer Nahar as Pandey
Shivraj as RBI Officer

Controversy
The film was initially rumored to be a remake of the American film Phone Booth, which the producer Sohail Maklai denied. 20th Century Studios filed a complaint against the makers of Knock Out before the film's release. The Bombay High Court had initially passed an injunction against the film's release after watching both the films. However, the producers were allowed to release the film on appeal, and deposited INR 1.5 crore to the court.

The matter was reheard in March 2013, with the court decreeing the case and awarding INR 1.25 crore to Fox, further telling the producers of Phone Booth to not exploit their film in any manner whatsoever from 5 March 2013 onwards.

Reception
Nikhat Kazmi of The Times of India gave the film 3 stars out of 5 stars, noting "all the action transpiring around the phone booth" to be the only similarity with Phone Booth. Taran Adarsh from Bollywood Hungama gave the film 2.5 stars out of 5, similarly pointing out that "what follows after a point bears no resemblance to that film (Phone Booth)", and also found it similar to A Wednesday in spite of their different storylines. He praised the focused plot and the finale, while criticizing the film's occasional repetitiveness. Patcy N. from Rediff.com gave the film 1.5 stars out of 5, praising Irrfan Khan's performance, while criticizing the climax and the overall execution.

Soundtrack
The film's music was given by Gourov Dasgupta, with a background score by Atul Raninga and Sanjay Wandrekar. The soundtrack has five original tunes, one remix, and an alternate version of one song.

References

External links
 

2010 action thriller films
2010 crime action films
2010 crime thriller films
2010 psychological thriller films
2010 films
2010s Hindi-language films
Indian remakes of American films
Indian action thriller films
Indian crime action films
Indian crime thriller films
Indian psychological thriller films
Films about snipers
Films about telephony
Films directed by Mani Shankar